Aulnois-sous-Laon (literally Aulnois under Laon) is a commune in the department of Aisne in the Hauts-de-France region of northern France.

Geography
Aulnois-sous-Laon is located some 30 km southeast of Saint-Quentin and 5 km due north of Laon. The A26 autoroute passes through the northeastern part of the commune but has no exit in the commune. The D967 road also passes through the commune from Crecy-sur-Serre in the north continuing to Laon in the south. The village can be accessed by the D541 branching west from the D967 passing through the village and continuing west to Vivaise. The D545 road also come from the south through the village and continues northeast to Barenton-Bugny. The commune is predominantly farmland with a little forest.

The Ru d'Alnois rises south of the village and flows northeast changing to the Ruisseau de Longuedeau and forming the northeastern border of the commune before continuing northeast joining the Ru des Barentons which eventually joins the Souche river at Barenton-sur-Serre.

Neighbouring communes and villages

Heraldry

Administration

List of Successive Mayors of Aulnois-sous-Laon

Population

Sights
Two sites in the commune are registered as historical monuments:
The remains of an old Feudal Castle (13th century)
The Park around the Castle

See also
Communes of the Aisne department

References

External links
Aulnois-sous-Laon official website 
Aulnois-sous-Laon on the old National Geographic Institute website 
40000 bell towers website 
Aulnois-sous-Laon on Géoportail, National Geographic Institute (IGN) website 
Aulnois on the 1750 Cassini Map

Communes of Aisne